The giant stargazer (Kathetostoma giganteum) is a stargazer  of the family Uranoscopidae, found on the continental shelf around New Zealand and endemic to that area.

It is commonly called monkfish, but this should not be confused with the Northern Hemisphere monkfish which is an entirely different genus of fish, Lophius, in another order, Lophiiformes.

References

 
 Tony Ayling & Geoffrey Cox, Collins Guide to the Sea Fishes of New Zealand,  (William Collins Publishers Ltd, Auckland, New Zealand 1982) 

Uranoscopidae
Endemic marine fish of New Zealand
Fish described in 1873